Guadalcanal Diary is a memoir written by war correspondent Richard Tregaskis and originally published by Random House on January 1, 1943.  The book recounts the author's time with the United States Marine Corps on Guadalcanal in the early stages of the pivotal months-long battle there starting in 1942.

Tregaskis relates combat and conversation in an easily readable vernacular, citing the full name, rank, and hometown of each of the Marines he encountered during the weeks he was on the island.

The book was well received in the USA upon publication, in particular for its description of the camaraderie amongst the Marines. It was subsequently made required reading for all USMC officer candidates.

Almost immediately after publication, the memoir was made into a movie of the same name featuring William Bendix, Richard Conte, Anthony Quinn, and John Archer, marking the movie debut of Richard Jaeckel.

See also
 Guadalcanal Campaign

Notes

1943 non-fiction books
Guadalcanal Campaign
Non-fiction books about the United States Marine Corps
History books about World War II
Pacific theatre of World War II
Random House books
American memoirs